Malagonia is a genus of moths of the family Erebidae. The genus was erected by George Hampson in 1926.

Species
Malagonia acypera (Hampson, 1902) north-east Himalayas
Malagonia sundana Holloway, 2005 Borneo, Sumatra

References

Calpinae